The Cornwall League 2 2007–08 was a full season of rugby union within Cornwall League 2.

Team Changes
There was no promotion or relegation for the following season, 2008–09, and the number of teams in Cornwall League 2 fell from eight teams to six as Illogan Park and Callington withdrew from the league

Table

Points are awarded as follows:
 2 points for a win
 1 point for a draw
 0 points for a loss

References

See also

 Trelawney's Army Cornwall rugby website

2007–08 in English rugby union leagues
Cornwall League 2